Whampoa Single Member Constituency was a single member constituency (SMC) located in the eastern region of Singapore. The constituency covers the main area of Whampoa. 

In 1968, Whampoa Constituency was formed by carving out of Kallang Constituency. In 1988, it was renamed as Whampoa Single Member Constituency as part of Singapore's political reforms. It existed for another term till 1991 when it was abolished and divided into Kampong Glam Group Representation Constituency (GRC), Jalan Besar GRC and Toa Payoh GRC.

In 2011, Whampoa SMC was recreated by carving out from Jalan Besar GRC. It was later merged back to Jalan Besar GRC again in the 2015 Singaporean general election.

Member of Parliament

Electoral results

Elections in 1960s

Elections in 1970s

Elections in 1980s

Elections in 2010s

Historical maps

References

Singaporean electoral divisions
Kallang
Novena, Singapore